Impro Airways was a helicopter airline based at Tribhuvan International Airport in Kathmandu, Nepal, operating chartered helicopter services.

History 

The Civil Aviation Authority of Nepal (CAAN) granted Impro Airways an Air Operators Certificate in 2006 permitting it to operate domestic charter services to remote sectors with three passenger and cargo-versioned MI-17 (MI-8 AMT) MTV helicopters, after it initially planned to operate a fleet of Dornier 228 aircraft.

On January 10, 2010, the Civil Aviation Authority of Nepal officially revoked Cosmic Air's Air operator's certificate, after it ceased operations in 2008.

Destinations 
Impro Airways was permitted to operate charter flights to any airport or heliport in Nepal.

Fleet 
At the time of closure, Impro Airways operated the following aircraft:

References 

Defunct helicopter airlines
2006 establishments in Nepal
2008 disestablishments in Nepal